The Benetton B198 is a Formula One racing car with which the Benetton Formula One team competed in the 1998 Formula One season. It was driven by Giancarlo Fisichella, who had moved from Jordan, and Alexander Wurz, who was in his first full season of F1 after deputising for the unwell Gerhard Berger in 1997.

Early in the season, Benetton held third place in the Constructors' Championship after Fisichella finished second at two successive races and took pole position in Austria. However, the team ultimately finished the season in fifth place, placing some blame with Bridgestone for favouring eventual champions McLaren, the tyre supplier's top team at that time.

Complete Formula One results
(key) (results in bold indicate pole position; results in italics indicate fastest lap) 

* Denotes Mecachrome-built engines, badged as Playlife

References

B198
1998 Formula One season cars